Premier Secondary School ( Nepali : प्रिमियर माध्यमिक विधालय ) is a boarding school in Rajbiraj, Nepal. The school was established in 1998. The founder of the school is Rajesh Karna. The school has around 500 students. It is one of the school who produces reasonable percentage of results in School Leaving Certificate exams. Abhishek Shrivastav from the school topped Saptari district in SLC 2072 BS and get awarded by PABSON.  The school provides qualitative education to all the studying students.

The school offers education in English medium with Nepali taught as vernaculars. Other subjects are taught as per the norms of the Department of Education in Nepal.

Education
There are currently classes from Junior level Nursery to Grade 10 in Premier Secondary School:

 School Leaving Certificate (SLC but now SEE> Secondary Education Examination (Nepal)) (a nationwide curriculum up to class 10 prescribed by the Department of Education of Nepal under Office of Controller of Examinations, Sanothimi, Bhaktapur).

Infrastructure
The building is two-storeyed, and there is a computer lab. The playground is big enough to host all minor sports.

Sports and extra-curricular activities

The school conducts a major sports event on 14 September (Bhadra 29) every year to celebrate Children's Day. Prizes are given to the winners of different games, as well as to students who have shown good performance in different fields like discipline, responsibility, cleanliness throughout the year.

References

See also
 List of educational institutions in Rajbiraj

Boarding schools in Nepal
Educational institutions established in 1998
1998 establishments in Nepal